A freemartin or free-martin (sometimes martin heifer) is an infertile female cattle with masculinized behavior and non-functioning ovaries. Phenotypically, the animal appears female, but various aspects of female reproductive development are altered due to acquisition of anti-Müllerian hormone from the male twin. Genetically, the animal is chimeric:  karyotypy of a sample of cells shows XX/XY chromosomes.  The animal originates as a female (XX), but acquires the male (XY) component in utero by exchange of some cellular material from a male twin, via vascular connections between placentas: an example of microchimerism. The chimerism is mainly present in the hematopoietic stem cells.

History 

Freemartins are known to have been described by the Roman writer Varro, who called them .

The 18th-century physician John Hunter discovered that a freemartin always has a male twin.

It was hypothesized early in the 20th century that masculinizing  factors travel from the male twin to the female twin through the vascular connections of the placenta because of the vascular fusion and affect the internal anatomy of the female.

Several researchers made the discovery that a freemartin results when a female fetus has its chorion fuse in the uterus with that of a male twin. The result was published in 1916 by Tandler and Keller. The discovery was made independently by American biologist Frank R. Lillie, who published it in Science in 1916. Both teams are now credited with the discovery.

In rural areas folklore often claimed this condition was not just peculiar to cattle, but extended also to human twins; this belief perpetuated for generations, as was mentioned in the writings of Cuthbert Bede.

Etymology
The etymology of the term "freemartin" is uncertain: speculations include that "free" may indicate "willing" (referring to the freemartin's willingness to work) or "exempt from reproduction" (referring to its sterility, or to a farmer's decision to not bother trying to breed a freemartin, or both), or that it may be derived from a Flemish word for a cow which gives no milk and/or has ceased to be capable of bearing offspring; "martin" is generally held to derive from an Irish or Gaelic word for "cow" or "heifer", although connections to Martinmas have also been posited.

Mechanism
In most cattle twins, the blood vessels in the chorions become interconnected, creating a shared circulation for both twins.  If both fetuses are the same sex this is of no significance, but if they are different, male hormones pass from the male twin to the female twin.  The male hormones (testosterone and anti-Müllerian hormone) then masculinize the female twin, and the result is a freemartin.  The degree of masculinization is greater if the fusion occurs earlier in the pregnancy – in about ten percent of cases no fusion takes place and the female remains fertile.

The male twin is largely unaffected by the fusion, although the size of the testicles may be slightly reduced.  Testicle size is associated with fertility, so there may be some reduction in bull fertility.

Freemartins behave and grow in a similar way to castrated male cattle (steers).

Diagnosis
If suspected, a test can be done to detect the presence of the male Y-chromosomes in some circulating white blood cells of the subject. Genetic testing for the Y-chromosome can be performed within days of birth and can aid in the early identification of a sterile female bovine.

Physical examination of the calf may also reveal differences:  a subjective assessment is that frequently there is a lengthened tuft of hair at the ventral tip of the vulva in a freemartin heifer atypical in fertile heifer calves. Also, often many (but not all) freemartins will have a shortened length of vagina compared with that of a fertile heifer. Commercial probes are available to check heifers for obvious freemartinism in lieu of doing a blood test

Other animals
A freemartin is the normal outcome of mixed twins in all cattle species which have been studied.  It does not normally occur in most other mammals, though it has been recorded in sheep, goats, and pigs.

Uses
Freemartins are occasionally used in stem cell and immunology research.  
During fetal development cells are exchanged between the fused circulations of the bovine twins.  Up to 95% of the freemartin's blood cells can be derived from those of her twin brother.  Male-derived cells and their progeny can be easily visualised in the freemartin tissues, as only they contain the male Y chromosome. Thus, by analysing these tissues, one can investigate the capacity of hematopoietic stem cells or other circulating cells to produce other tissues in addition to blood. The freemartin model allows one to analyse perfectly healthy and unmanipulated animals, without resorting to transplantation often used in stem cell research.

Fictional use
 In the Aldous Huxley novel Brave New World, a "freemartin" (mentioned in chapters 1, 3, 11 and 17) is a woman who has been deliberately made sterile by exposure to hormones during fetal development; in the book, government policy requires freemartins to constitute 70% of the female population. A side effect of this is some freemartin women having developed beards.
 The Robert A. Heinlein novel Beyond This Horizon lists "the clever and repulsively beautiful pseudo-feminine freemartins" as one of the genetically-engineered specialist types of humans that were created in the "Empire of the Great Khans" (chapter 2).
In the Robert Heinlein novel Farnham's Freehold, the protagonist, Hugh Farnham, is given a companion ("bedwarmer") that is described as a "natural freemartin".
In the Avram Davidson story "The House the Blakeneys Built", the cattle are freemartins.
In the fantasy book series Bazil Broketail by Christopher Rowley, "freemartin" is the name for a breed of sterile female dragons.
In Footfall by Larry Niven and Jerry Pournelle, a lithely-built human woman uses the term "freemartin" to describe herself, while doubting her sexuality.
In Nicola Griffith's novel Hild, the title character is sometimes referred to by others as a freemartin, in reference to her non-feminine character and social role.
 In Lauren Groff's novel Matrix (New York: Riverhead Books, 2021), 12th-century English peasants use freemartins to pull wagons.

References

External links
 Mosaicism and Chimerism at colostate.edu 
 Picture at agric.gov.ab.ca

Bovine health
Twin
Female mammals